Thirthahalli is a panchayat town located in the Shimoga district of the state of Karnataka, India. It lies on the bank of the river Tunga and is also the headquarters of the Thirthahalli Taluk of Shimoga district.

Geography 

It has an average elevation of 591 metres (1938 feet). The Tirthahalli Town Panchayat has population of 14,528 of which 7,093 are males while 7,435 are females as per report released by Census India 2011.

Languages 
The majority of people speak Kannada. There are also a sizeable number of Tulu speakers in this region.

Notable people
 Kuvempu - Kannada author and poet, Jnanapeetha and Padma Vibhushan awardee
 Shantaveri Gopala Gowda - Socialist Leader and Politician.
 U. R. Ananthamurthy-  Contemporary writer, Novelist and critic, Jnanapeetha and Padma Bhushan awardee.
 Kadidal Manjappa- Politician and former Chief Minister of Karnataka
 Justice. M Rama Jois - Advocate and Chief Justice, Former Governor of Jharkhand and Bihar
 M. K. Indira, Kannada Novelist.
 Poornachandra Tejaswi- writer, environmentalist and son of kuvempu.
 Anupama Niranjana- Novelist 
 Girish Kasaravalli- Multiple award-winning Kannada Film Director, Padmashri awardee.
 Kimmane Rathnakar- Politician and former minister of Legislative assembly
 Araga Jnanendra- Home Minister of Karnataka and former chairman of Mysore Paper Mills.
 Kaviraj (lyricist)- Poet, lyricist, director in Kannada film industry 
 Diganth-Kannada film actor

Education institutions

 Tunga Mahavidyalaya
 Sahyadri Polytechnic

 Sevabharathi Higher Primary School

References

External links

 Official Website of Thirtahalli Town Panchayath

Cities and towns in Shimoga district
Populated places in the Western Ghats
Tourism in Karnataka
Taluks in Shimoga District